Yoshiki Takahashi may refer to:

, Japanese footballer
, ring name of Kazuo Takahashi (born 1969), Japanese mixed martial artist